is a former Japanese football player.

Club statistics

References

External links

web.archive.org

1986 births
Living people
Association football people from Shizuoka Prefecture
Japanese footballers
J1 League players
J2 League players
Japan Football League players
Vissel Kobe players
FC Ryukyu players
Association football midfielders